Sérézin may refer to several communes in France:
 Sérézin-de-la-Tour, in the Isère department
 Sérézin-du-Rhône, in the Rhône department